The Ministry of Environment, Forest and Climate Change (Paribēś, bana o jalabayou paribarton mantraṇālaẏa) is a ministry of the government of the People's Republic of Bangladesh whose role is ensuring the sustainable environment and optimum forest coverage. Ministry of Environment, Forests and Climate Change is an independent ministry of the Government of the People's Republic of Bangladesh. Its main function is to plan, promote, coordinate and monitor government activities related to the environment and forest. This Ministry was established to look after all environmental matters in Bangladesh, and the Ministry is a permanent member of the Executive Committee of the National Economic Council. The Ministry is a participant in the United Nations Environment Program (UNEP). The main functions of the Ministry include environmental conservation, survey of forest and environmental elements, prevention of environmental degradation and pollution control, afforestation and restoration of degraded areas, and overall protection of the environment. Previously the ministry's name was the Ministry of Environment and Forest. On May 14, 2018, the cabinet changed the name to Ministry of Environment, Forest and Climate Change.

History
From 1947 to 1962, the divisional forest department was under the Conservator of Forests, and subsequently under the Chief Conservator of Forests till 1971. When Bangladesh became independent in 1971, the reserved and proposed reserved forests came under the jurisdiction of the Bangladesh Forest Department. From 1971 to 1989, the Bangladesh Forest Department was under the Ministry of Agriculture. During 1987-89, Forestry was a department of the Ministry of Agriculture, under a Secretary. The Department of Environment (DoE) was established in Bangladesh in 1977 under the Environmental Pollution Control Ordinance, 1977. Finally, the Bangladesh Ministry of Forest and Environment was established in 1989. At the same time, the Forest Department was placed under this Ministry as a technical wing and the Department of Environment was responsible for the implementation of the Environment Protection Act, of 1995.

Departments of Ministry
Department of Environment
Forest Department
Bangladesh Climate Change Trust
Bangladesh National Herbarium
Bangladesh Forest Research Institute (BFRI)
Bangladesh Forest Industries Development Corporation
Bangladesh Rubber Board

Significant Activities
In 2004, the Ministry of Forest and Environment of Bangladesh jointly with the Ministry of Forests of the Government of India conducted a tiger survey in both parts of the Sundarbans

References

 
Environment and Forest
Environment of Bangladesh
Environment ministries
Forestry ministries
Forestry in Bangladesh
1972 establishments in Bangladesh